Capco is a business and technology management consultancy owned by Wipro, operating primarily in the financial services and energy sectors. Capco's operational headquarters are in London, England (approx. 2,000 consultants), with 32 offices across the Americas, Europe, and Asia Pacific. The company offers services primarily in banking, capital markets, wealth and investment management, insurance, finance, risk & compliance. It also has an energy consulting practice in the US.

History
Capco was founded in Belgium  in 1998 by Rob Heyvaert as 'The Capital Markets Company NV'. It had offices in Antwerp, London, Toronto, New York, and Frankfurt. In 2001, the company rebranded itself to Capco, and the first issue of the Capco Journal of Financial Transformation was published by The Capco Institute. 

In 2015, Rob Heyvaert left Capco with Lance Levy taking over as Capco CEO.

In 2010, Fidelity National Information Services (FIS) signed a deal with Symphony Technology Group to buy Capco for approximately $300 million.

In 2017, FIS sold a majority stake in Capco to Clayton, Dubilier & Rice (CD&R), a private equity firm based in New York, making Capco an independent company again. FIS continues to retain a 40 percent equity interest in the company.

On 4 March 2021, Wipro announced that it had acquired Capco for US$1.45 billion. The deal was completed on 29 April.

Acquisitions 

 2007 - British-based City Practitioners Limited for an undisclosed sum.
 2019 - Atom Solutions, a Houston-based IT firm.
 2020 - Creative Construction, a Germany-based digital consultancy .

References

FIS (company)
Wipro
2010 mergers and acquisitions
1998 establishments in Belgium
Companies based in London
Consulting firms established in 1998
Financial services companies established in 1998
Financial services companies of the United Kingdom
2021 mergers and acquisitions
British subsidiaries of foreign companies
Management consulting firms of the United Kingdom
Information technology consulting firms of the United Kingdom
International information technology consulting firms
International management consulting firms